Nuke is a node-based digital compositing and visual effects application first developed by Digital Domain, and used for television and film post-production. Nuke is available for Microsoft Windows 7, OS X 10.9, Red Hat Enterprise Linux 5, and newer versions of these operating systems. Foundry has further developed the software since Nuke was sold in 2007.

Nuke's users include Digital Domain, Walt Disney Animation Studios, Blizzard Entertainment, DreamWorks Animation, Illumination Mac Guff, Sony Pictures Imageworks, Sony Pictures Animation, Framestore, Weta Digital, Double Negative, and Industrial Light & Magic.

History 
Nuke (the name deriving from 'New compositor') was originally developed by software engineer Phil Beffrey and later Bill Spitzak for in-house use at Digital Domain beginning in 1993. In addition to standard compositing, Nuke was used to render higher-resolution versions of composites from Autodesk Flame.

Nuke version 2 introduced a GUI in 1994, built with FLTK – an in-house GUI toolkit developed at Digital Domain.  FLTK was subsequently released under the GNU LGPL in 1998.

Nuke won an Academy Award for Technical Achievement in 2001.

In 2002, Nuke was publicly released by D2 Software. In 2005, Nuke 4.5 introduced a new 3D subsystem developed by Jonathan Egstad.

In 2007, The Foundry, a London-based plug-in development company, took over development and marketing of Nuke from D2. The Foundry released Nuke 4.7 in June 2007, and Nuke 5 was released in early 2008, which replaced the interface with Qt and added Python scripting, and support for a stereoscopic workflow. In 2015, The Foundry released Nuke Non-commercial with some basic limitations. Nuke supports use of The Foundry plug-ins via its support for the OpenFX standard (several built-in nodes such as Keylight are OpenFX plugins).

Similar products 
 Fusion – Blackmagic Design
 Autodesk Flame - Autodesk
 Boris RED – Boris FX
 Natron
 After Effects – Adobe
 Motion – Apple
While not intended for compositing, the free and open source Blender contains a limited node-based compositing feature which, among other things, is capable of basic keying and blurring effects.

References

External links 
 
 Sourceforge site for the OpenFX effects plug-in standard

Compositing software
Visual effects software
Proprietary software that uses Qt
Software that uses FLTK
Software that uses Qt